Buchinga, also known as Ebuchinga, is a small town in the Western Province of Kenya.

It is located approximately 15 kilometers west of Kakamega and 20 kilometres east of Mumias (Latitude: .283333 / Longitude: 34.65). It has a primary and a secondary school. Buchinga was established near the intersection of the road to Kakamega and the road to Bukura. Its residents are primarily of the Olutstootso Luhya ethnic group. Buchinga is the site of a vibrant market, which offers good prices on sugarcane.

References 

Populated places in Western Province (Kenya)